Piotr Wiśniewski (born 11 August 1982) is a retired Polish footballer. All four of his teams were based in the Pomeranian area, with his longest and most notable spell with Lechia Gdańsk from 2005 until 2017 when he retired from professional football. During his 13 seasons at Lechia he became something of an icon, ranking highly in both all time appearances and goals for the club.

Career

Early years
Wiśniewski started his career with his local team Wierzyca Starogard Gdański, playing with them from 2000–03 in the lower leagues of Polish football. For the 2003–04 season Wiśniewski joined Kaszubia Kościerzyna in the II liga. During the 2004–05 season Wiśniewski left Kaszubia and dropped down a division in winter transfer window to play with Lechia Gdańsk.

Lechia Gdańsk
Immediately with Lechia he won the III liga, seeing Lechia back in the II liga for the first time since they had to restart in the lower divisions in 2001. The next three seasons saw Lechia rise up the league, eventually winning the division in the 2007-08 season. Wiśniewski played 16 games that season scoring four goals as he helped Lechia to the title. 2008-09 saw Lechia in the Ekstraklasa, with Wiśniewski playing 23 times in his first season in the top flight. Lechia initially struggled in the top division, finishing mid-table or in the bottom half in the first four seasons. Wiśniewski was consistent in those seasons scoring 3 goals in each season, and playing in most of Lechia's games. On 14 August 2011 Wiśniewski played in Lechia Gdańsk's first ever game in their new stadium, PGE Arena, coming on in the 77th minute for Marcin Pietrowski. The move into the new stadium saw Lechia's fortunes in the league improve. Despite a difficult first season where Lechia finished 13th, and then 8th, they then went on to finish in the top 5 for the next four seasons. After the move into the PGE Arena Wiśniewski consistently played over 20 games a season, with his most successful personal seasons coming in 2012-13 when he scored a career high of 7 goals in all competitions, and in 2013-14 when he played in a career high of 29 games. In the 2014-15 season Lechia finished in 5th place, narrowly missing out on qualification for the Europa League by one place. During this season Wiśniewski played 23 times and scored 6 in the league. This proved to be his last season playing consistently in the first team, with Wiśniewski only playing 10 and 4 league games in his final two seasons. 2016-17 was his final season in professional football. In the last home game of the season against Pogoń Szczecin, Lechia celebrated the careers of Piotr Wiśniewski and Mateusz Bąk. Both players had played over 10 years for Lechia, while Lechia was the only professional club Wiśniewski played for. Both players came on as substitutes in the 4–0 win over Pogon, with Wiśniewski scoring the final goal of the game, while Bąk made an important save to keep a clean sheet for the team. In total Wiśniewski played 260 times for Lechia, scoring 48 goals.

Retirement and coaching
After leaving Lechia he joined armature team AS Pomorze Gdańsk for a season before it was announced that Wiśniewski would be returning to Lechia Gdańsk being given the role as a coach for the first team, before becoming a Lechia Gdańsk II coach at the start of the 2018–19 season.

Honours
Lechia Gdańsk
II liga (second tier)
Winners (1): 2007-08

III liga (third tier)
Winners (1): 2004-05

Career statistics

Club

External links 
 

1982 births
Living people
Polish footballers
Ekstraklasa players
Lechia Gdańsk players
People from Starogard Gdański
Sportspeople from Pomeranian Voivodeship

Association football midfielders